

The Nash Petrel also known as the Procter Petrel is a two-seat aerobatic or glider tug aircraft. It was designed for amateur production by Procter Aircraft Associates of Camberley, Surrey, England. By the time the aircraft first flew, Procter had changed ownership and had been renamed Nash Aircraft Ltd.

Development
Based on the earlier Mitchell-Procter Kittiwake design, the Petrel is an all-metal low-wing cantilever monoplane of conventional design powered by a 130 hp Rolls-Royce Continental O-240-A piston engine. Only two aircraft were built, the prototype registered G-AXSF and one built by apprentices at the British Aircraft Corporation factory at Preston in 1973, registered G-BACA. G-BACA had a serious fault with the landing gear and only flew 15 hours before being grounded. The prototype still exists but without a current certificate of airworthiness. It is presently fitted with a Lycoming O-360-A3A engine.

Specifications

Notes

References

Roland Beaumont - Testing Years - Ian Allan published 1980

1980s British civil utility aircraft
Glider tugs
Low-wing aircraft
Single-engined tractor aircraft
Aircraft first flown in 1980